Jahangir Asgari (born November 22, 1986) is an Iranian footballer who plays as a forward.

Club career
After playing at First Division club Niroye Zamini, Asgari joined Paykan F.C. in Iran Pro League in 2008. He was the best goal scorer of the season for Paykan on 2010–2011 season but that could not help Paykan and club was relegated to lower division. After Payakn was relegated to First Division he signed a two-year contract with Damash Gilan, which newly promoted to the Iran Pro League.

 Assist Goals

References

1986 births
Living people
People from Ilam Province
Iranian footballers
Paykan F.C. players
Niroye Zamini players
Damash Gilan players
Azadegan League players
Association football forwards